Touch Gold (foaled May 26, 1994 in Kentucky) is an American Thoroughbred racehorse best known as the winner of the Classic Belmont Stakes, in which he ended Silver Charm's bid for the U.S. Triple Crown.

Background
Sired by Canadian Horse Racing Hall of Fame inductee Deputy Minister, Touch Gold is out of the mare Passing Mood, a daughter of U.S. Racing Hall of Fame inductee Buckpasser. A late foal born at the end of May, he was purchased by Frank Stronach for $375,000 at the July 1995 Keeneland select yearling sale. He was sent into training with Daniel J. Vella at Woodbine Racetrack in Toronto, Ontario, Canada.

Racing career

1996: two-year-old season
After Touch Gold won a 6-furlong maiden race, his best 1996 stakes results were a third in the Grey Stakes and a second in the Swynford Stakes.

1997: three-year-old season

Early season
Sent to race in the United States under new trainer David Hofmans, Touch Gold won a 6-furlong allowance race at Santa Anita Park, then at Keeneland Race Course won April's Lexington Stakes, in which he defeated top three-year-old Smoke Glacken by 8½ lengths.

Not entered in the Kentucky Derby, Touch Gold competed in the second leg of the U.S. Triple Crown series, the Preakness Stakes. At the start of the race, the colt stumbled but rallied to challenge the leaders until he tired in the homestretch to finish fourth behind Silver Charm. He came out of the Preakness with a sore left front hoof but recovered enough to enter the Belmont Stakes three weeks later.

1997 Belmont Stakes
Going into the 1997 Belmont Stakes, Silver Charm was favored to become the first Triple Crown winner since Affirmed in 1978. His main opposition was expected to come from the entry of Touch Gold and Wild Rush, stretch-running Crypto Star, and Free House who had finished third in the Derby and second in the Preakness. In the Belmont, Touch Gold held a slim lead early but relinquished it at the halfway mark. Coming into the top of the stretch, he was fourth, blocked behind a wall of horses running three-wide. Jockey Chris McCarron swung Touch Gold to the far outside, where he rallied to win over Silver Charm by three-quarters of a length.

After Belmont
After his 1997 Belmont Stakes win, Touch Gold was sent to rest in California in order to allow his sore hoof time to heal. He eventually returned to win that year's Grade I Haskell Invitational Handicap at Monmouth Park but in the fall's Breeders' Cup Classic, he finished ninth and last. At age four in 1998, he raced four times, only going back to the track at the end of June when he won a one-mile allowance race at Churchill Downs in a time of 1:34, one fifth of a second off the track record. His next best result came in October when he finished second in the Fayette Stakes. In the Breeders' Cup Classic, he finished eighth in a ten-horse field.

Stud career
Owned by a syndicate that includes Frank Stronach, Touch Gold stands at stud at Adena Springs in Midway, Kentucky. He sired four Grade I winners in his first two crops. In 2006, his son Royal Challenger won the Breeders' Stakes, the third leg of the Canadian Triple Crown, and Seek Gold won the Grade I Stephen Foster Handicap.

Touch Gold was pensioned from stud duty in 2015, and was sent to Old Friends Equine Thoroughbred Retirement Farm. He resides there along with his son, Seek Gold.

References
 Touch Gold's pedigree and partial racing stats
 Video at YouTube of Touch Gold winning the 1997 Belmont Stakes
 Touch Gold at Adena Springs

1994 racehorse births
Racehorses bred in Kentucky
Racehorses trained in the United States
Belmont Stakes winners
Thoroughbred family 2-n
Old Friends Equine Retirement